The Red and the Black is a 1954 French-Italian historical drama film directed by Claude Autant-Lara, who co-wrote the screenplay with Jean Aurenche and Pierre Bost, based on the novel The Red and the Black by Stendhal.  The film starred Gérard Philipe, Antonella Lualdi and Danielle Darrieux, and won the French Syndicate of Cinema Critics award for the best film of 1955 and the Grand Prix de l'Académie du Cinéma the same year.

It was shot the Saint-Maurice Studios in Paris. The film's sets were designed by the art director Max Douy.

Shown in various versions, the film's length is generally given as 113 minutes. In Canada it was 171 minutes; a longer version in France was 185 minutes（or 194 minutes in 2 parts and at its New York opening it was 137 minutes.

Cast
Gérard Philipe as Julien Sorel 
Danielle Darrieux as Madame de Rénal 
Antonella Lualdi as Mathilde de la Mole 
Jean Mercure as Marchese de la Môle 
Jean Martinelli as Monsieur de Rénal 
Antoine Balpêtré as Abate Pirard 
Anna Maria Sandri as Elisa
Mirko Ellis as Norbert de la Môle
Pierre Jourdan as Comte Altamira 
 Jean Mercure as Marquis de La Mole 
 Alexandre Rignault as Le père Sorel 
 Gérard Séty as Le lieutenant Liéven 
 Jacques Varennes as Le président du tribunal
 Claude Sylvain as 	Amanda Binet

References

External links
 
 
 Le Rouge et le noir at Filmsdefrance.com
 

1954 films
Films based on French novels
Films based on works by Stendhal
Films directed by Claude Autant-Lara
Films set in the 1820s
Films with screenplays by Jean Aurenche
Films with screenplays by Pierre Bost
1950s historical drama films
French historical drama films
Italian historical drama films
1950s French films
1950s Italian films